Al-Kompars (International title: The Extras) is a Syrian feature film by director Nabil Maleh. It features Bassam Kousa and Samar Sami.

External links
 

1993 films
1990s Arabic-language films
Films directed by Nabil Maleh
Syrian comedy films
Syrian drama films